Karen Katz (born September 16, 1947) is an American author and illustrator of children's books.

Her first book, Over the Moon, was inspired by the experience of adopting her daughter Lena from Central America.

Partial bibliography
 Over the Moon: An Adoption Tale, Henry Holt and Co., 1997
 The Colors of Us, Henry Holt and Co., 1999
 Where Is Baby's Belly Button?, Little Simon, 2000
 Where is Baby's Mommy?, Little Simon, 2001
 Excuse Me!: A Little Book of Manners, Grosset & Dunlap, 2002
 Grandma and Me, Little Simon, 2002
 No Biting!, Grosset & Dunlap, 2002
 Daddy and Me, Little Simon, 2003
 Toes, Ears, & Nose!, Little Simon, 2003
 My First Kwanzaa, Henry Holt and Co., 2003
 No Hitting!, Grosset & Dunlap, 2004
 Grandpa and Me, Little Simon, 2004
 A Potty for Me!, Little Simon, 2004
 What Does Baby Say?, Little Simon, 2004
 Daddy Hugs, Little Simon, 2005
 My First Chinese New Year, Henry Holt and Co., 2005
 Ten Tiny Tickles, Margaret K. McElderry, 2005
 Can You Say Peace?, Henry Holt and Co., 2006
 Mommy Hugs, Margaret K. McElderry, 2006
Wiggle Your Toes, Little Simon, 2006
 Where Is Baby's Pumpkin?, Little Simon, 2006
 Where Is Baby's Valentine?, Little Simon, 2007
 My First Ramadan, Henry Holt and Co., 2007
 Peek-a-Baby, Little Simon, 2007
 Where Is Baby's Dreidel, Little Simon, 2007
 Baby's Day, Little Simon, 2007
 Princess Baby, Random House, 2008
 Ten Tiny Babies, Margaret K. McElderry, 2008
 Where Are Baby's Easter Eggs?, Little Simon, 2008
 Where Is Baby's Birthday Cake?, 
Little Simon, 2008 
 Princess Baby, Night-Night, Random House, 2009
 Shake It Up, Baby!, Little Simon, 2009
 Where Is Baby's Beach Ball?, Little Simon, 2009
 Beddy-Bye, Baby, Little Simon, 2009
 Where Is Baby's Christmas Present?, Little Simon, 2009
 Baby at the Farm, Little Simon, 2010
 Baby's Colors, Little Simon, 2010
 Baby's Numbers, Little Simon, 2010
 Baby's Shapes, Little Simon, 2010
 Where is Baby's Puppy?, Little Simon, 2011
 The Babies on the Bus, Henry Holt and Co., 2011
 Counting Kisses, Little Simon, 2011

References

External links

 

1947 births
Living people
American children's writers
American women illustrators
American illustrators
Writers from Newark, New Jersey
Artists from Newark, New Jersey
21st-century American women